Lilla Skogssjön is a lake in Stockholm county, Södermanland, Sweden.  It lies just south of the larger Stora Skogssjön.

Lakes of Stockholm County